St. Croix School District is a school district in the United States Virgin Islands.

The district serves students on island of St. Croix.

Schools

High schools
 St. Croix Central High School
 St. Croix Educational Complex

Middle schools
 Elena Christian Junior High School
 Arthur A. Richards Junior High School
 John H. Woodson Junior High School

Elementary schools
 Alfredo Andrews Elementary School
 Charles H. Emanuel Elementary School
 Juanita F. Gardine Elementary School
 Alexander Henderson Elementary School
 Pearl B. Larsen Elementary School
 Claude O. Markoe Elementary School
 Lew Muckle Elementary School
 Ricardo Richards Elementary School
 Eulalie R. Rivera Elementary School
 Evelyn M. Williams Elementary School

Other
 St. Croix Vocational School (Kingshill)

External links
 St. Croix School District
 St. Croix School District (Archive)

School districts in the United States Virgin Islands
Saint Croix, U.S. Virgin Islands